Samuel C. Pomeroy (1816–1891) was a U.S. Senator from Kansas from 1861 to 1873. Senator Pomeroy may also refer to:

Jim Pomeroy (politician) (born 1936), North Dakota State Senate
Robert Watson Pomeroy (1902–1989), New York State Senate
Theodore M. Pomeroy (1824–1905), New York State Senate